Patricia Schumann (born 4 June 1975) is a Danish actress. She graduated from the Danish National School of Theatre and Contemporary Dance in 2005.

Filmography

TV series

References

External links

1975 births
Living people
Danish actresses
Best Supporting Actress Bodil Award winners